Dainava is a mostly Soviet-built neighbourhood built in 1963, initially as a microdistrict) located in the north-northeast part of second largest Lithuanian city of Kaunas.

It has an elderate status. Before 2005 it included the Gričiupis section (dalys), split into a separate elderate.
The borough borders Highway A1, and Kaunas Free Economic Zone in the north, Petrašiūnai borough in the east, Gričiupis elderate in the south as well as Žaliakalnis and Eiguliai elderate s in the west.

Known for parks, most of them renovated since late 2010s, dense network of public transport, many trolleybus lines crosses the neighborhood. Largest being Park of Friendship completed in 1973.  The neighbourhood was built in a typical soviet fashion. It is one of the largest elderates by population in Kaunas with over 70,000 inhabitants as of 2006 despite its small area of only .

References

External links 
 Official site

Neighbourhoods of Kaunas